A Bachelor's Life Abroad is a 1992 Polish comedy film directed by Andrzej Barański. It was entered into the 18th Moscow International Film Festival.

Cast
 Marek Bukowski as Michal
 Bożena Dykiel as Frau Luther
 Magdalena Wójcik as Agata
 Artur Barciś as Stefan
 Jan Frycz as Herman
 Marek Walczewski as Carousel Owner Schumann
 Ewa Buczko as Angela
 Cynthia Kaszynska as Regina
 Jaroslaw Gruda as Franek
 Andrzej Mastalerz as Staszek
 Witold Wieliński as Wacek

References

External links
 

1992 films
1992 comedy films
1990s Polish-language films
Polish comedy films